Autonomic dysreflexia (AD) is a potentially fatal medical emergency classically characterized by uncontrolled hypertension and bradycardia, although tachycardia is known to commonly occur. AD occurs most often in individuals with spinal cord injuries with lesions at or above the T6 spinal cord level, although it has been reported in patients with lesions as low as T10. Guillain–Barré syndrome may also cause autonomic dysreflexia.

The uncontrolled hypertension in AD may result in mild symptoms, such as sweating above the lesion level, goosebumps, blurred vision, or headache; However, severe hypertension may result in potentially life-threatening complications including seizure, intracranial bleed, or retinal detachment.

AD is triggered by either noxious or non-noxious stimuli, resulting in sympathetic stimulation and hyperactivity. The most common causes include bladder or bowel over-distension, from urinary retention and fecal compaction, respectively, extreme temperatures, fractures, undetected painful stimuli (such as a pebble in a shoe), and extreme spinal cord pain. The resulting sympathetic surge transmits through intact peripheral nerves, resulting in systemic vasoconstriction below the level of the spinal cord lesion. The peripheral arterial vasoconstriction and hypertension activates the baroreceptors, resulting in a parasympathetic surge originating in the central nervous system to inhibit the sympathetic outflow; however, the parasympathetic signal is unable to transmit below the level of the spinal cord lesion. This results in bradycardia, tachycardia, vasodilation, flushing, pupillary constriction and nasal stuffiness above the spinal lesion, while there is piloerection, pale and cool skin below the lesion due to the prevailing sympathetic outflow.

Initial treatment involves sitting the patient upright, removing any constrictive clothing (including abdominal binders and support stockings), rechecking blood pressure frequently, and then checking for and removing the inciting issue, which may require urinary catheterization or bowel disimpaction. If systolic blood pressure remains elevated (over 150 mm Hg) after initial steps, fast-acting short-duration antihypertensives are considered, while other inciting causes must be investigated for the symptoms to resolve.

Prevention of AD involves educating the patient, family and caregivers of the precipitating cause, if known, and how to avoid it, as well as other triggers. Since bladder and bowel are common causes, prevention involves routine bladder and bowel programs and urological follow-up for cystoscopy/urodynamic studies.

Signs and symptoms 

This condition is distinct and usually episodic, with the people potentially experiencing remarkably high blood pressure, intense headaches, profuse sweating, facial erythema, goosebumps, nasal stuffiness, a "feeling of doom" or apprehension, and blurred vision. An elevation of 20 mm Hg over baseline systolic blood pressure, with a potential source below the neurological level of injury, meets the current definition of dysreflexia.

Complications 

Autonomic dysreflexia can become chronic and recurrent, often in response to longstanding medical problems like soft tissue pressure injuries or hemorrhoids. Long term therapy may include alpha blockers or calcium channel blockers.

Complications of severe acute hypertension can include seizures, pulmonary edema, myocardial infarction, or cerebral hemorrhage. Additional organs that may be affected include the kidneys and retinas of the eyes.

Causes 

The first episode of autonomic dysreflexia may occur weeks to years after spinal cord injury takes place, but most people at risk (92%) develop their first episode within the first year after injury.

The most common causative factor is bladder distention (responsible for approximately 85% of cases). Other common causes include a urinary tract infections, pressure ulcers, medication side effects and various disease processes.

Pain 

Current scientific literature suggests that noxious (painful) stimuli below the level of the lesion are the primary initiators of AD. The most common such stimuli are distension of a hollow viscous such as the bladder or the rectum. Thus, assessment of autonomic dysreflexia in patients with known causative factors may include palpation of the bladder and bowel and can also include bladder scan.

Not all noxious stimuli will cause AD. Some otherwise severe noxious stimuli, e.g. broken bones, may not result in AD, and may in fact even go unnoticed.  Activation of pain receptors in muscle and skin below the lesion in spinal cord injured individuals did not trigger AD. These studies suggests that not all noxious stimuli are reliable triggers of AD, and because non-noxious stimuli can also trigger AD, attribution of an episode of AD to noxious stimuli may cause clinicians to overlook underlying non-noxious triggers.  As a result, non-noxious trigger factors remain undetected, prolonging an episode of AD.

Mechanism 
Supraspinal vasomotor neurons send projections to the intermediolateral cell column, which is composed of sympathetic preganglionic neurons (SPN) through the T1-L2 segments. The supraspinal neurons act on the SPN and its tonic firing, modulating its action on the peripheral sympathetic chain ganglia and the adrenal medulla. The sympathetic ganglia act directly on the blood vessels they innervate throughout the body, controlling vessel diameter and resistance, while the adrenal medulla indirectly controls the same action through the release of epinephrine and norepinephrine. The descending autonomic pathways, which are responsible for the supraspinal communication with the SPN, are interrupted resulting in decreased sympathetic outflow below the level of the injury. In this circumstance, the SPN is controlled only by spinal influences. The first couple of weeks after a spinal injury, the decreased sympathetic outflow causes reduced blood pressure and sympathetic reflex. Eventually, synaptic reorganization and plasticity of SPN develops into an overly sensitive state, which results in abnormal reflex activation of SPN due to afferent stimuli, such as bowel or bladder distension. Reflex activation results in systemic vasoconstriction below the spinal cord disruption.  The peripheral arterial vasoconstriction and hypertension activates the baroreceptors, resulting in a parasympathetic surge originating in the central nervous system, which inhibits the sympathetic outflow; however, the parasympathetic signal is unable to transmit below the level of the spinal cord lesion. This results in vasodilation, flushing, pupillary constriction and nasal stuffiness above the spinal lesion, while there's piloerection, pale and cool skin below the lesion due to the prevailing sympathetic outflow.
The reason this issue is much more prominent for lesions at or above the T6 level is because the Splanchnic nerves emerge from the T5 level and below. Loss of brain's control over T6 and below causes splanchnic arteries to reflexively vasoconstrict and since the Splanchnic arteries are the body's largest reservoir for circulating blood, their vasoconstriction dramatically affects the blood pressure of the body.

Diagnosis 

The symptoms are usually not subtle, although asymptomatic events have been documented. Autonomic dysreflexia differs from autonomic instability, the various modest cardiac and neurological changes that accompany a spinal cord injury, including bradycardia, orthostatic hypotension, and ambient temperature intolerance.  In autonomic dysreflexia, patients will experience hypertension, sweating, spasms (sometimes severe spasms) and erythema (more likely in upper extremities) and may experience headaches and blurred vision.  Mortality is rare with AD, but morbidity such as stroke, retinal hemorrhage and pulmonary edema if left untreated can be quite severe.  Older patients with very incomplete spinal cord injuries and systolic hypertension without symptoms are usually experiencing essential hypertension, not autonomic dysreflexia. Aggressive treatment of these elderly patients with rapidly acting antihypertensive medications can have disastrous results.

Treatment 

Proper treatment of autonomic dysreflexia involves administration of anti-hypertensives along with immediate determination and removal of the triggering stimuli. Often, sitting the patient up and dangling legs over the bedside can reduce blood pressures below dangerous levels and provide partial symptom relief. Tight clothing and stockings should be removed. Straight catheterization of the bladder or relief of a blocked urinary catheter tube may resolve the problem.  The rectum should be cleared of stool impaction, using anaesthetic lubricating jelly. If the noxious precipitating trigger cannot be identified, drug treatment is needed to decrease elevating intracranial pressure until further studies can identify the cause.

Drug treatment includes the rapidly acting vasodilators, including sublingual or topical nitrates or oral hydralazine or clonidine.  Ganglionic blockers are also used to control sympathetic nervous system outflow.  Topical nitroglycerin ointment is a convenient and safe treatment—an inch or two can be applied to the chest wall or forehead, and wiped off when blood pressures begin to normalize.  Autonomic dysreflexia is abolished temporarily by spinal or general anaesthesia. These treatments are used during obstetric delivery of women with autonomic dysreflexia.

Prognosis 
The cause of autonomic dysreflexia itself can be life-threatening, and must also be completely investigated and treated appropriately to prevent unnecessary morbidity and mortality.

The Consortium for Spinal Cord Medicine has developed evidence-based clinical practice guidelines for the management of autonomic dysreflexia in adults, children, and pregnant women. There is also a consumer version of this guideline.

References

Further reading

External links 

Neurotrauma
Medical emergencies
Medical terminology
Peripheral nervous system disorders